Founded in 1854, Butzel Long is one of the oldest law firms in Michigan. Based in Detroit, Michigan, the firm has 155 attorneys throughout the state, in New York City, and in Washington, D.C. It has alliance offices in Mexico and China. Butzel Long is listed at number 284 in the 2012 ranking of the largest U.S. law firms by the National Law Journal.

The firm is a founding member of Lex Mundi, one of the first and largest networks of leading independent law firms located in 160 separate jurisdictions around the world.

Notable lawyers and alumni
William L. Carpenter, justice on the Michigan Supreme Court
Donald M. Dickinson, 34th United States postmaster general
Roger Gregory, chief judge of the United States Court of Appeals for the Fourth Circuit
Rich Strenger, former National Football League offensive tackle
Barbara L. McQuade, United States attorney for the Eastern District of Michigan
Laurie J. Michelson, United States district judge on the United States District Court for the Eastern District of Michigan
Christopher Taylor, mayor of Ann Arbor
Charles B. Warren, former United States ambassador to Japan and United States ambassador to Mexico

Offices
Detroit, Michigan
Bloomfield Hills, Michigan
Ann Arbor, Michigan
Lansing, Michigan
New York, New York
Washington, D.C.

References

External links
Official website
Practice areas
Martindale-Hubbell profile

Law firms based in Detroit
Law firms established in 1854
1854 establishments in Michigan